Bar Rescue is an American reality TV series that premiered on Paramount Network (formerly Spike) on July 17, 2011. It stars Jon Taffer (a long-time food and beverage industry consultant specializing in nightclubs and pubs), who offers his professional expertise, access to service industry experts, and renovations and equipment to desperately failing bars in order to save them from closing.

It is commonly believed that Taffer takes a percentage of the businesses he rescues; however, this is totally untrue. All renovations and improvements are paid for by sponsors, with no cost to the businesses. Additionally, the businesses featured on Bar Rescue are under no obligation to follow any of the rescue protocols or keep any of the changes. Throughout the show's history, multiple bars have restored their original name or motif after filming wraps. Episodes are shot in real-time for 5-day stretches, however, considerable planning happens ahead of time.

239 episodes, including 1 removed episode (unintentionally aired), have aired as of March 19, 2023.

Series overview

Episodes

Season 1 (2011)

Season 2 (2012)

Season 3 (2013–14)

Season 4 (2014–16)

Season 5 (2016–17)

Season 6 (2018–19)

Season 7 (2020)

Season 8 (2021-)

Specials

Notes:

References

External links

Bar Rescue Updates – Unaffiliated site that keeps track of bars being open or closed and has updates for each bar

Episodes
Lists of reality television series episodes